The Netherlands competed at the 1968 Summer Olympics in Mexico City, Mexico. 107 competitors, 82 men and 25 women, took part in 52 events in 11 sports.

Medalists

Gold
 Ada Kok — Swimming, Women's 200m Butterfly
 Jan Wienese — Rowing, Men's Single Sculls
 Joop Zoetemelk, Jan Krekels, Fedor den Hertog, and René Pijnen — Cycling, Men's Team 100k Time Trial

Silver
 Jan Jansen and Leijn Loevesijn — Cycling, Men's 2000m Tandem
 Harry Droog and Leendert van Dis — Rowing, Men's Double Sculls
 Roderick Rijnders, Herman Suselbeek, and Hadriaan van Nes — Rowing, Men's Coxed Pairs

Bronze
 Maria Gommers — Athletics, Women's 800m

Athletics

Boxing

Men's Middleweight (– 75 kg)
 Jan van Ispelen
 First Round — Defeated Miguel Villugron (CHL), TKO-2
 Second Round — Lost to Mate Parlov (YUG), 1:4

Canoeing

Cycling

Ten cyclists represented the Netherlands in 1968.

Individual road race
 René Pijnen
 Jan Krekels
 Harrie Jansen
 Joop Zoetemelk

Team time trial
 Fedor den Hertog
 Jan Krekels
 René Pijnen
 Joop Zoetemelk

Sprint
 Jan Jansen
 Leijn Loevesijn

1000m time trial
 Leijn Loevesijn

Tandem
 Jan Jansen
 Leijn Loevesijn

Individual pursuit
 Fedor den Hertog

Team pursuit
 Piet Hoekstra
 Henk Nieuwkamp
 Klaas Balk
 Joop Zoetemelk

Diving

Hockey

Rowing

Sailing

Swimming

Men
Elt Drenth
Dick Langerhorst
Aad Oudt
Johan Schans
Bob Schoutsen

Women
Toos Beumer
Klenie Bimolt
Nel Bos
Cobie Buter
Mirjam van Hemert
Marjan Janus
Ada Kok
Hella Rentema
Hennie Penterman
Coby Sikkens
Bep Weeteling

Water polo

Men's Team Competition
 Preliminary Round (Group B)
 Drew with Italy (3-3)
 Lost to Yugoslavia (4-7)
 Lost to DDR (3-8)
 Defeated United Arabic Republic (6-3)
 Defeated Greece (9-5)
 Defeated Mexico (8-1)
 Defeated Japan (9-1)
 Classification Matches
 5th-8th place: Lost to United States (3-6)
 7th-8th place: Defeated Cuba (8-5) → 7th place

Team Roster
 Bart Bongers
 Fred van Dorp
 Loet Geutjes
 André Hermsen
 Hans Hoogveld
 Evert Kroon
 Ad Moolhuijzen
 Hans Parrel
 Nico van der Voet
 Feike de Vries
 Hans Wouda

Weightlifting

References

External links
 Dutch Olympic Committee

Nations at the 1968 Summer Olympics
1968
S